Macon County Courthouse may refer to:

 Macon County Courthouse (Alabama), Tuskegee, Alabama
 Macon County Courthouse (Georgia), Oglethorpe, Georgia
 Macon County Courthouse and Annex, Macon, Missouri